Mount Comfort is an unincorporated community in Buck Creek Township, Hancock County, Indiana.

History
A post office was established at Mount Comfort in 1851, and remained in operation until it was discontinued in 1956.

Mount Comfort was platted as a town in about 1882, when the railroad was extended to that point.

Geography

References

Unincorporated communities in Hancock County, Indiana
Unincorporated communities in Indiana
Indianapolis metropolitan area